Henri Paul Gaston Maspero (15 December 188317 March 1945) was a French sinologist and professor who contributed to a variety of topics relating to East Asia. Maspero is best known for his pioneering studies of Daoism. He was imprisoned by the Nazis during World War II and died in the Buchenwald concentration camp.

Life and career
Henri Maspero was born on 15 December 1883 in Paris, France.  His father, Gaston Maspero, was a famous French Egyptologist who was of Italian ancestry.  Maspero was also Jewish. After studies in history and literature, in 1905 he joined his father in Egypt and later published the study Les Finances de l'Egypte sous les Lagides. After returning to Paris in 1907, he studied the Chinese language under Édouard Chavannes and law at Institut national des langues et civilisations orientales. In 1908 he went to Hanoi, studying at the École française d'Extrême-Orient.

In 1918 he succeeded Édouard Chavannes as the chair of Chinese at the Collège de France. He published his monumental La Chine Antique in 1927. During the following years he replaced Marcel Granet for the chair of Chinese civilisation at the Sorbonne, directed the department of Chinese religions at the École pratique des hautes études, and was selected to be a member of the Académie des inscriptions et belles-lettres.

On 26 July 1944, Maspero and his wife, who were still living in Nazi-occupied Paris, were arrested because of their son's involvement with the French Resistance. Maspero was sent to the Buchenwald concentration camp, where he endured its brutal conditions for over six months before dying on 17 March 1945, aged 61, only three weeks before the camp's liberation by the U.S. Third Army.

See also 
Georges Maspero (1872–1942), French sinologist, son of Gaston, brother of Henri and Jean
Jean Maspero (1885–1915), French papyrologist, brother of Henri and Georges
François Maspero (1932–2015), French author, journalist and publisher, son of Henri

References

Citations

Sources

External links
Some of his works are available free online courtesy of the Université du Québec à Chicoutimi
 Henri Maspero, by E. Bruce Brooks: biography with photographs

1883 births
1945 deaths
French sinologists
French Jews who died in the Holocaust
Academic staff of the Collège de France
French orientalists
French people who died in Buchenwald concentration camp
Members of the Académie des Inscriptions et Belles-Lettres
French civilians killed in World War II
Jewish French writers